Hendon Central is a London Underground station in North West London on the A41.

The station is on the Edgware branch of the Northern line, between Colindale and Brent Cross stations, and is on the boundary between Travelcard Zone 3 and Zone 4.  Its postcode is NW4 2TE. It was opened along with Brent Cross (then called Brent) tube station on 19 November 1923 as the first stage of an extension of the Golders Green branch of the Charing Cross, Euston and Hampstead Railway. The station served as the terminus of the line's western fork until 18 August 1924 when the second and final section of the extension to Edgware was opened.

History
Hendon Central, like all stations north from Golders Green, is a surface station (although the tracks enter twin tunnels a short distance further north on the way to Colindale). When it was built it stood "in lonely glory amid fields", as one writer puts it, south of the old village of Hendon, which has since been swallowed up by London's suburbs. The station is a Grade II listed building, designed in a neo-Georgian style by Stanley Heaps, who also designed Brent Cross station in a similar style, with a prominent portico featuring a Doric colonnade.

The fact that the area was largely undeveloped allowed a hitherto unusual degree of coordination between the station and the surrounding buildings that were constructed over the next few years. The station was intended to be the centre and a key architectural feature of a new suburban town; it faces a circus  in diameter that is intersected by four approach roads which provide access to all parts of Hendon and the surrounding areas beyond. For many years this was a roundabout known as 'Central Circus'; however it is now a crossroads controlled by traffic signals. Writing in 1932, William Passingham commented the integrated approach taken at Hendon Central as "an outstanding example of the co-ordination of road-planning with passenger station requirements." He noted, only nine years after the station opened, that it had already become the centre of an "ever-widening cluster of new houses" and accurately predicted that it would become "the centre of [a] small township", or what would now be called a suburb.

Connections 
London Buses routes 83, 113, 143, 186, 324 and 326 and night route N113 serve the station.

Gallery

References

External links

 London Transport Museum Photographic Archive
 
 
 
 
  Note rural landscape beyond station awaiting development.
 

Northern line stations
Tube stations in the London Borough of Barnet
Former London Electric Railway stations
Railway stations in Great Britain opened in 1923
Hendon
London Underground Night Tube stations
Stanley Heaps railway stations
1923 establishments in England